The Tybo Charcoal Kilns are a pair of charcoal kilns located  north of Tybo, Nevada. The kilns each have three openings: a top opening, a door at ground level, and a rear window with a ramp for wood wagons. The kilns were among 15 built in 1874 for the Tybo Consolidated Company. The company, which mined the region's silver, used charcoal to fuel its smelting furnace. To acquire its fuel, it imported wood from nearby hills, which it then converted to charcoal in the kilns.

The kilns were built during a mining boom in the area around Tybo. Though the community had only been settled in 1870, by the end of the decade it had a post office, school, newspaper, and almost 1000 residents.

The kilns were added to the National Register of Historic Places on November 19, 1974.

References

External links

Industrial buildings and structures on the National Register of Historic Places in Nevada
National Register of Historic Places in Nye County, Nevada
Industrial buildings completed in 1874
Kilns
Charcoal ovens
1874 establishments in Nevada